Corusichthys megacephalus is an extinct pycnodontid that lived during the lower Cenomanian of what is now Lebanon.  C. megacephalus is known from a 34 mm long fossil.  It had plates arranged like a helmet around its head, and had a massive, triangular spine on its dorsal side.  C. megacephalus is closely related the genera Trewavasia and Hensodon, as well as Coccodus.

See also

 Prehistoric fish
 List of prehistoric bony fish

References

Cretaceous bony fish
Pycnodontiformes genera
Late Cretaceous fish of Asia